National Assembly elections were held in the Republic of China on 22 December 1991. The result was a victory for the Kuomintang, which won 254 of the 325 seats. Voter turnout was 68.3%.

Results

References

Taiwan
Taiwanese National Assembly elections
1991 elections in Taiwan